Naya Raasta ( New Path) is a 1970 Hindi-language drama film, produced by I.A.Nadiadwala on Pushpa Pictures banner and directed by Khalid Akhtar. The film stars Jeetendra, Asha Parekh, and music composed by N. Datta.

Plot
Chander is a very successful criminal lawyer decides to settle down in a village and look after his land after his father's death. He practices the new ideas that and tries to educate the workers by mixing up with them. In the process, he falls in love with a beautiful girl Shallo. Now everyone tries to pressurize Chander not to marry Shallo, but he was firm, which Panchayat couldn't accomplish by force, Chander's mother manages it with ease by describing the consequences of such marriage, and she persuades Shallo to get married to the boy of her community and she has to do so. Chander is aghast and heartbroken. However, this disappointment in love, instead of breaking him, Chander works with new zeal and energy. On the other hand, it is just the beginning of Shallo's misfortune and her past follows her as a ghost. She is not accepted by the in-law who asked her to leave but she refuses. For that, she is meted out severe punishments.

In the meantime, Chander's younger sister Radha gets married in the same village, her husband Thakur Suraj Pratap Singh is a drunkard. Being a lady of virtue, Radha decides to set out to change her husband on one hand and tries to put Shallo's house in order on the other hand. Shallo's husband Ramu is convinced of his wife's virtue but the mother-in-law remains adamant. Consequently, Ramu decides to leave with his wife, and Thakur who has evil designs on Shallo gives them shelter in his Shikargaah. One night he calls Ramu, expresses his desire for Shallo, and offers a lot of money and comforts in exchange which hurts Ramu's self-respect and he violently protests, in the fight Ramu is killed. Shallo kills Thakur with the same spear which had taken her husband's life and she was charged in court for both the murders. The rest of the story is about whether she is proven innocent or not.

Cast
Jeetendra as Chandar 
Asha Parekh as Shallo 
Balraj Sahni as Bansi
Sujit Kumar as Ramu 
Farida Jalal as Radha Singh 
Veena as Rukmini 
Lalita Pawar as Tulsi 
Kishan Mehta as Thakur Suraj Pratap Singh

Soundtrack 
All lyrics provided by Sahir Ludhianvi & music by N. Datta.

References

External links
 

1970 films
1970s Hindi-language films
1970 drama films
Films scored by Datta Naik
Indian drama films
Hindi-language drama films